This article is about the particular significance of the year 1774 to Wales and its people.

Incumbents
Lord Lieutenant of Anglesey - Sir Nicholas Bayly, 2nd Baronet
Lord Lieutenant of Brecknockshire and Monmouthshire – Charles Morgan of Dderw
Lord Lieutenant of Caernarvonshire - Thomas Wynn
Lord Lieutenant of Cardiganshire – Wilmot Vaughan, 1st Earl of Lisburne
Lord Lieutenant of Carmarthenshire – George Rice
Lord Lieutenant of Denbighshire - Richard Myddelton  
Lord Lieutenant of Flintshire - Sir Roger Mostyn, 5th Baronet 
Lord Lieutenant of Glamorgan – John Stuart, Lord Mountstuart
Lord Lieutenant of Merionethshire - William Vaughan
Lord Lieutenant of Montgomeryshire – Robert Clive (until 2 November)
Lord Lieutenant of Pembrokeshire – Sir William Owen, 4th Baronet
Lord Lieutenant of Radnorshire – Edward Harley, 4th Earl of Oxford and Earl Mortimer

Bishop of Bangor – John Ewer (until 28 October) John Moore
Bishop of Llandaff – Shute Barrington
Bishop of St Asaph – Jonathan Shipley
Bishop of St Davids – Charles Moss (until 2 June); James Yorke (from 26 June)

Events
July - Dr Samuel Johnson accompanies Hester Thrale and her husband on a visit to North Wales.
unknown dates
John Wilkinson takes out a patent for cannon-boring at his works in Bersham.
An Act of Parliament establishes the Improvement Commissioners, responsible for paving, cleaning streets and providing oil lamp lighting in Cardiff.
Construction work is completed on Morris Castle, "Wales's first block of flats".
Edward Jones, an "exhorter" at Whitefield's Tabernacle, Moorfields, and a lay preacher, begins holding Welsh-language services in Cock Lane, Smithfield, London.

Arts and literature

New books
Hugh Hughes - Rheolau Bywyd Dynol (translation of Robert Dodsley's The Oeconomy of Human Life
Dafydd Jones - Marwnad Enoch Ffransis
Hugh Jones (Maesglasau) - Cydymaith yr Hwsmon

Music
William Williams Pantycelyn - Ychydig Hymnau (hymns)

Paintings
Thomas Jones - The Bard
Richard Wilson - Llyn y Cau, Cadair Idris

Births
16 January - Daniel Evans, independent minister (died 1835)
May - John Elias, preacher (died 1841)
24 June - Azariah Shadrach, writer (died 1844)
date unknown - Sir John Waters, military commander (died 1842)

Deaths
13 January - John Pugh Pryse, politician, 34
4 July - William Price, High Sheriff of Merionethshire and Caernarvonshire, 84
28 October - John Ewer, Bishop of Bangor, about 70
date unknown
Rowland Jones, philologist, 57 
Dafydd Nicolas, poet

References

Wales
Wales